Programmed to Consume is the second full-length album by Abysmal Dawn. It was released on May 13, 2008 in the United States. It is their first album with Relapse Records.

Track listing

Personnel
 Charles Elliott - guitars, vocals
 Jaime Boulanger - guitars
 Terry Barajas - drums
 Michael Cosio - bass
 Mick Mullin - mastering

References

2008 albums
Relapse Records albums
Abysmal Dawn albums
Albums with cover art by Pär Olofsson